Suitland-Silver Hill was a census-designated place (CDP) in Prince George's County, Maryland for the 2000 U.S. census. The census area included the separate unincorporated communities of Silver Hill and Suitland, and other smaller communities. The population was 33,515 at the 2000 census. For the 2010 census, the CDP was separated into Silver Hill and Suitland. The community was named for a 19th-century landowner, State Senator Samuel Taylor Suit and his estate.

The Suitland-Silver Hill area was known as having one of the highest crime rates in Prince George's County. The Suitland Manor neighborhood, located at the intersections of Maryland Route 218 (Suitland Road) and Maryland Route 458 (Silver Hill Road) was targeted for demolition by the county because of the frequent occurrence of violent crime and drug trafficking in the area. As of late 2005, Prince George's County was in the process of purchasing all of the apartment buildings on the three roads that make up the neighborhood (Homer Avenue, Hudson Avenue, and Huron Avenue), so that they could be demolished and replaced with mixed commercial and residential properties. In 2005, seven people were shot and killed in this three-block area, and another was killed in a hit and run. Suitland Manor is directly across Suitland Road from the Suitland Federal Center, which houses the national headquarters of the United States Census Bureau, among other government agencies. Suitland is currently poised to take advantage of development and multiple economic engines being established throughout this area of Prince George's County.

Revitalization is being attempted in the area by different community organizations as they strive to undo the damage done to the reputation of the area by the former "pay to play" politics that existed in Prince George's County. The new administration of the Suitland Citizens Association has made great strides in rebuilding the trust of the local community and the Suitlandfest Community Development Corporation hosts and designs activities, programs and events that try to bring forth positive change, enhance the education, recreation, health and fitness, artistic development, social and economic conditions in this at-risk but growing area. Suitland is alleged to be one of the most dangerous places in the county but current crime statistics do not support that contention  .

Steny Hoyer, House Majority Leader of the United States House of Representatives, moved to the area in his teens and attended Suitland High School.

Geography
Suitland-Silver Hill is located at  (38.850462, −76.923742).

Demographics

As of the census of 2000, there were 33,515 people, 13,149 households, and 8,652 families residing in the CDP. The racial makeup of the CDP was 3.86% White, 93.01% African American, 0.31% Native American, 0.60% Asian, 0.03% Pacific Islander, 0.64% from other races, and 1.56% from two or more races. Hispanic or Latino of any race were 1.86% of the population.

There were 13,149 households, out of which 39.9% had children under the age of 18 living with them, 25.8% were married couples living together, 33.5% had a female householder with no husband present, and 34.2% were non-families. 27.5% of all households were made up of individuals, and 4.4% had someone living alone who was 65 years of age or older. The average household size was 2.55 and the average family size was 3.08.

In the CDP, the population was spread out, with 32.2% under the age of 18, 9.8% from 18 to 24, 34.8% from 25 to 44, 18.3% from 45 to 64, and 5.0% who were 65 years of age or older. The median age was 30 years. For every 100 females, there were 78.7 males. For every 100 females age 18 and over, there were 70.0 males.

The median income for a household in the CDP was $41,870, and the median income for a family was $43,635. Males had a median income of $33,633 versus $31,460 for females. The per capita income for the CDP was $19,031. About 9.3% of families and 10.7% of the population were below the poverty line, including 14.2% of those under age 18 and 9.5% of those age 65 or over.

Transportation
The community is served by three Washington Metro stations Naylor Road , Suitland and Branch Avenue on the Green Line (Washington Metro).

Education
The area is served by Prince George's County Public Schools, and zoned to Suitland High School, Drew Freeman Middle School, Suitland Elementary School.

References

Populated places in Prince George's County, Maryland
Former census-designated places in Maryland
Washington metropolitan area